Cemal Amet (born 29 March 1998) is a footballer who plays as a defensive midfielder for SK Austria Klagenfurt in the Austrian Football First League. Born in Austria, he represented Turkey at youth international levels.

Career
Amet began his career in Austria with FC Kärnten. In 2007, he went to Austria Kärnten. In 2010, he moved to Austria Klagenfurt. In 2012, he played for a year in the AKA Kärnten. After the rise in professional football in 2014, he made his pro debut against SK Sturm Graz II.

References

External links
 
 

1998 births
Living people
Sportspeople from Klagenfurt
Footballers from Carinthia (state)
Austrian footballers
Turkish footballers
Association football midfielders
2. Liga (Austria) players
SK Austria Klagenfurt players
Turkey youth international footballers